Run Kid Run is a Christian pop/rock band from Carmi, Illinois and Morganfield, Kentucky, formed in 2006. Their debut album This Is Who We Are, was released on May 18, 2006 through Tooth & Nail Records. All of the members, except Paul Stewart, were originally from punk rock band Side Walk Slam on Tooth & Nail Records. The video for the song "We've Only Just Begun" was featured on the American Eagle music video store soundtrack after its release. The band's second album titled Love at the Core was released on April 29, 2008. Both albums were produced by James Paul Wisner.
The song "Freedom" become a hit song on the Christian radio station Air 1. Their recent work in the studio with Mark Lee Townsend and Matt Thiessen brought forth Patterns, released November 15, 2011.

Discography

Albums

Singles

* No. 56 in 2006, No. 73 in 2007  

** No. 42 in 2007, No. 14 in 2008 

*** No. 18 in 2008, No. 43 in 2009

Songs Featured On Compilations

Members
 David Josiah Curtis - vocals, guitar
 Neil Endicott - guitar, piano, backing vocals
 Paul Stewart - bass
 Matt Jackson - drums

 Former
 Lyle Chastain - bass

References

Christian rock groups from Illinois
Musical groups established in 2006
Pop punk groups from Illinois
Tooth & Nail Records artists
2006 establishments in Illinois